
Stausee Gibidum (Gibidum reservoir or "Stausee Gebidem") is a reservoir in the canton of Valais, Switzerland. Its surface area is 0.21 km², shared by the municipalities of Naters and Riederalp.

The construction of Gebidem dam was started in 1964 and completed by 1967. The arch dam has an elevation of 122 m and a crest length of 327 m.

See also
List of mountain lakes of Switzerland

External links
Swiss Dams: Gebidem

Lakes of Valais
Reservoirs in Switzerland
Gebidem